Gmina Zakrzew is a rural gmina (administrative district) in Lublin County, Lublin Voivodeship, in eastern Poland.

Villages
Gmina Zakrzew contains the villages and settlements of Annów, Baraki, Boża Wola, Dębina, Karolin, Majdan Starowiejski, Nikodemów, Ponikwy, Szklarnia, Targowisko, Targowisko-Kolonia, Tarnawka Druga, Tarnawka Pierwsza, Wólka Ponikiewska, Zakrzew and Zakrzew-Kolonia.

Neighbouring gminas
Gmina Zakrzew is bordered by the gminas of Batorz, Bychawa, Chrzanów, Godziszów, Turobin, Wysokie and Zakrzówek.

References

Zakrzew
Lublin County